The 2010–11 Los Angeles Clippers season is the 41st season of the franchise in the National Basketball Association (NBA), and the 27th in Los Angeles.

This was Blake Griffin's first year in the league. He was named an All-Star, becoming the first rookie since Yao Ming in 2003. Despite the team's mediocre record, Griffin was named Rookie of the Year at season's end.

Key dates
 June 24 – The 2010 NBA draft was held in New York City.
 July 1 – The free agency period begun.

Summary

NBA Draft 2010

Draft picks

Roster

Roster Notes
 Forward Brian Cook becomes the 16th former Laker to play with the crosstown rival Clippers.

Pre-season

Game log

|- bgcolor="#ffcccc"
| 1
| October 5
| @ Portland
| 
| Chris Kaman (14)
| Chris Kaman,Blake Griffin (7)
| Randy Foye (5)
| Rose Garden18,209
| 0–1
|- bgcolor="#ccffcc"
| 2
| October 7
| @ Sacramento
| 
| Chris Kaman (20)
| Blake Griffin (13)
| Randy Foye (8)
| ARCO Arena10,284
| 1–1
|- bgcolor="#ffcccc"
| 3
| October 8
| @ Golden State
| 
| Blake Griffin (23)
| Blake Griffin (9)
| Randy Foye (6)
| Oracle Arena10,004
| 1–2
|- bgcolor="#ffcccc"
| 4
| October 12
| San Antonio
| 
| Eric Gordon (23)
| Blake Griffin (17)
| Baron Davis (7)
| Palacio de los Deportes18,674
| 1–3
|- bgcolor="#ffcccc"
| 5
| October 14
| Denver
| 
| Blake Griffin (24)
| Blake Griffin (14)
| Baron Davis (6)
| Staples Center10,572
| 1–4
|- bgcolor="#ffcccc"
| 6
| October 16
| Utah
| 
| Eric Gordon (23)
| Blake Griffin (14)
| Baron Davis (8)
| Staples Center18,997
| 1–5
|- bgcolor="#ffcccc"
| 7
| October 17
| Denver
| 
| Brian Cook (28)
| Al-Farouq Aminu (8)
| Baron Davis,Eric Bledsoe (7)
| Staples Center
| 1–6
|- bgcolor="#ffcccc"
| 8
| October 19
| Sacramento
| 
| Chris Kaman (21)
| Chris Kaman (10)
| Baron Davis (8)
| Staples Center10,838
| 1–7
|-

Regular season

Standings

Record vs. opponents

Game log

|- bgcolor="#ffcccc"
| 1
| October 27
| Portland
| 
| Eric Gordon (22)
| Blake Griffin (14)
| Randy Foye (5)
| Staples Center18,382
| 0–1
|- bgcolor="#ffcccc"
| 2
| October 29   
| @ Golden State
| 
| Eric Gordon (19)
| Blake Griffin (10)
| Baron Davis (8)
| Oracle Arena17,408
| 0–2
|- bgcolor="#ffcccc"
| 3
| October 31
| Dallas
| 
| Blake Griffin (16)
| Chris Kaman (13)
| Baron Davis (6)
| Staples Center13,718
| 0–3
|-

|- bgcolor="#ffcccc"
| 4
| November 1
| San Antonio
| 
| Eric Gordon (23)
| Blake Griffin,Chris Kaman (8)
| Eric Gordon (11)
| Staples Center14,964
| 0–4
|- bgcolor="#ccffcc"
| 5
| November 3
| Oklahoma City
| 
| Eric Gordon (27)
| Blake Griffin (9)
| Eric Bledsoe (8)
| Staples Center18,414
| 1–4
|- bgcolor="#ffcccc"
| 6
| November 5
| @ Denver
| 
| Blake Griffin (26)
| Blake Griffin (10)
| Eric Bledsoe (13)
| Pepsi Center15,559
| 1–5
|- bgcolor="#ffcccc"
| 7
| November 6
| @ Utah
| 
| Eric Gordon (27)
| Blake Griffin (17)
| Eric Gordon (5)
| EnergySolutions Arena19,911
| 1–6
|- bgcolor="#ffcccc"
| 8
| November 9
| @ New Orleans
| 
| Al-Farouq Aminu (20)
| Al-Farouq Aminu (8)
| Eric Bledsoe (8)
| New Orleans Arena12,479
| 1–7
|- bgcolor="#ffcccc"
| 9
| November 10
| @ San Antonio
| 
| Rasual Butler (18)
| Blake Griffin (8)
| Eric Bledsoe,Willie Warren (6)
| AT&T Center17,309
| 1–8
|- bgcolor="#ffcccc"
| 10
| November 12
| Detroit
| 
| Eric Gordon (28)
| Blake Griffin (18)
| Eric Bledsoe,Eric Gordon (5)
| Staples Center16,960
| 1–9
|- bgcolor="#ffcccc"
| 11
| November 15
| New Jersey
| 
| Eric Gordon (30)
| Eric Bledsoe,DeAndre Jordan (8)
| Eric Bledsoe (6)
| Staples Center14,516
| 1–10
|- bgcolor="#ffcccc"
| 12
| November 17
| @ Minnesota
| 
| Eric Gordon (30)
| Blake Griffin (17)
| Eric Gordon (7)
| Target Center12,909
| 1–11
|- bgcolor="#ffcccc"
| 13
| November 18
| @ Indiana
| 
| Eric Gordon (19)
| Al-Farouq Aminu,Eric Bledsoe,Blake Griffin (8)
| Eric Bledsoe (5)
| Conseco Fieldhouse12,459
| 1–12
|- bgcolor="#ffcccc"
| 14
| November 20
| New York
| 
| Blake Griffin (44)
| Blake Griffin (15)
| Blake Griffin (7)
| Staples Center18,325
| 1–13
|- bgcolor="#ccffcc"
| 15
| November 22
| New Orleans
| 
| Eric Gordon (27)
| Blake Griffin (13)
| Eric Bledsoe (6)
| Staples Center17,787
| 2–13
|- bgcolor="#ccffcc"
| 16
| November 25
| Sacramento
| 
| Eric Gordon (28)
| Blake Griffin (15)
| Eric Gordon (6)
| Staples Center11,504
| 3–13
|- bgcolor="#ffcccc"
| 17
| November 26
| @ Phoenix
| 
| Eric Gordon (32)
| Blake Griffin (14)
| Eric Gordon (6)
| US Airways Center17,486
| 3–14
|- bgcolor="#ffcccc"
| 18
| November 28
| Utah
| 
| Blake Griffin (35)
| Blake Griffin (14)
| Eric Gordon (9)
| Staples Center17,085
| 3–15
|-

|- bgcolor="#ccffcc"
| 19
| December 1
| San Antonio
| 
| Blake Griffin (31)
| Blake Griffin,DeAndre Jordan (13)
| Baron Davis (10)
| Staples Center16,584
| 4–15
|- bgcolor="#ffcccc"
| 20
| December 3
| @ Denver
| 
| Eric Gordon (24)
| Blake Griffin (12)
| Eric Bledsoe (8)
| Pepsi Center15,829
| 4–16
|- bgcolor="#ffcccc"
| 21
| December 5
| @ Portland
| 
| Eric Gordon (24)
| Blake Griffin (15)
| Baron Davis (8)
| Rose Garden20,139
| 4–17
|- bgcolor="#ccffcc"
| 22
| December 6
| Sacramento
| 
| Eric Gordon (29)
| Blake Griffin (11)
| Baron Davis (8)
| Staples Center14,964
| 5–17
|- bgcolor="#ffcccc"
| 23
| December 8
| L.A. Lakers
| 
| Eric Gordon (24)
| Blake Griffin,DeAndre Jordan (11)
| Eric Bledsoe (7)
| Staples Center19,614
| 5–18
|- bgcolor="#ffcccc"
| 24
| December 11
| Memphis
| 
| Eric Gordon (25)
| DeAndre Jordan (14)
| Eric Bledsoe (6)
| Staples Center14,970
| 5–19
|- bgcolor="#ffcccc"
| 25
| December 12
| Orlando
| 
| Eric Gordon (28)
| Blake Griffin (16)
| Eric Gordon (8)
| Staples Center18,278
| 5–20
|- bgcolor="#ffcccc"
| 26
| December 15
| @ Philadelphia
| 
| Blake Griffin (20)
| Blake Griffin (15)
| Baron Davis,Blake Griffin (5)
| Wells Fargo Center11,775
| 5–21
|- bgcolor="#ccffcc"
| 27
| December 17
| @ Detroit
| 
| Blake Griffin (24)
| Blake Griffin (17)
| Eric Bledsoe (8)
| The Palace of Auburn Hills16,046
| 6–21
|- bgcolor="#ccffcc"
| 28
| December 18
| @ Chicago
| 
| Blake Griffin (29)
| Blake Griffin (12)
| Baron Davis (7)
| United Center21,760
| 7–21
|- bgcolor="#ccffcc"
| 29
| December 20
| Minnesota
| 
| Eric Gordon (36)
| Ryan Gomes,Blake Griffin (10)
| Baron Davis (12)
| Staples Center16,053
| 8–21
|- bgcolor="#ffcccc"
| 30
| December 22
| Houston
| 
| Blake Griffin (24)
| Blake Griffin (18)
| Eric Gordon (6)
| Staples Center17,470
| 8–22
|- bgcolor="#ccffcc"
| 31
| December 26
| Phoenix
| 
| Blake Griffin (28)
| Blake Griffin (12)
| Baron Davis (9)
| Staples Center19,060
| 9–22
|- bgcolor="#ccffcc"
| 32
| December 27
| @ Sacramento
| 
| Eric Gordon (31)
| Blake Griffin (14)
| Baron Davis (9)
| ARCO Arena14,590
| 10–22
|- bgcolor="#ffcccc"
| 33
| December 29
| Utah
| 
| Blake Griffin (30)
| Blake Griffin (12)
| Baron Davis (9)
| Staples Center19,060
| 10–23
|-

|- bgcolor="#ffcccc"
| 34
| January 2
| Atlanta
| 
| Blake Griffin (31)
| Blake Griffin (15)
| Eric Gordon (6)
| Staples Center16,750
| 10–24
|- bgcolor="#ccffcc"
| 35
| January 5
| Denver
| 
| Eric Gordon (28)
| DeAndre Jordan (20)
| Baron Davis (8)
| Staples Center17,540
| 11–24
|- bgcolor="#ccffcc"
| 36
| January 9
| Golden State
| 
| Eric Gordon (25)
| DeAndre Jordan (13)
| Baron Davis (11)
| Staples Center17,696
| 12–24
|- bgcolor="#ccffcc"
| 37
| January 12
| Miami
| 
| Eric Gordon (26)
| Blake Griffin (14)
| Baron Davis (9)
| Staples Center19,803
| 13–24
|- bgcolor="#ffcccc"
| 38
| January 14
| @ Golden State
| 
| Eric Gordon,Blake Griffin (28)
| Blake Griffin (13)
| Eric Gordon (7)
| Oracle Arena19,273
| 13–25
|- bgcolor="#ccffcc"
| 39
| January 16
| L.A. Lakers
| 
| Eric Gordon (30)
| Blake Griffin,DeAndre Jordan (15)
| Baron Davis (8)
| Staples Center19,905
| 14–25
|- bgcolor="#ccffcc"
| 40
| January 17
| Indiana
| 
| Blake Griffin (47)
| Blake Griffin (14)
| Baron Davis (12)
| Staples Center15,863
| 15–25
|- bgcolor="#ccffcc"
| 41
| January 19
| Minnesota
| 
| Blake Griffin (29)
| DeAndre Jordan (12)
| Blake Griffin (6)
| Staples Center17,793
| 16–25
|- bgcolor="#ffcccc"
| 42
| January 20
| @ Portland
| 
| Eric Gordon (35)
| Blake Griffin (18)
| Baron Davis (6)
| Rose Garden20,630
| 16–26
|- bgcolor="#ccffcc"
| 43
| January 22
| Golden State
| 
| Blake Griffin (30)
| Blake Griffin (18)
| Blake Griffin (8)
| Staples Center19,373
| 17–26
|- bgcolor="#ffcccc"
| 44
| January 25
| @ Dallas
| 
| Blake Griffin (22)
| Blake Griffin (11)
| Baron Davis (6)
| American Airlines Center20,335
| 17–27
|- bgcolor="#ffcccc"
| 45
| January 26
| @ Houston
| 
| Randy Foye (20)
| DeAndre Jordan (12)
| Eric Bledsoe (6)
| Toyota Center18,147
| 17–28
|- bgcolor="#ccffcc"
| 46
| January 29
| Charlotte
| 
| Blake Griffin (24)
| Blake Griffin (10)
| Baron Davis (11)
| Staples Center18,332
| 18–28
|- bgcolor="#ccffcc"
| 47
| January 31
| Milwaukee
| 
| Blake Griffin (32)
| Blake Griffin (11)
| Baron Davis (7)
| Staples Center17,218
| 19–28
|-

|- bgcolor="#ffcccc"
| 48
| February 2
| Chicago
| 
| Blake Griffin (32)
| Blake Griffin (13)
| Blake Griffin (7)
| Staples Center19,368
| 19–29
|- bgcolor="#ffcccc"
| 49
| February 4
| @ Atlanta
| 
| Baron Davis (22)
| Blake Griffin (11)
| Baron Davis (13)
| Philips Arena19,363
| 19–30
|- bgcolor="#ffcccc"
| 50
| February 6
| @ Miami
| 
| Blake Griffin (21)
| Blake Griffin (16)
| Baron Davis (6)
| American Airlines Arena19,702
| 19–31
|- bgcolor="#ffcccc"
| 51
| February 8
| @ Orlando
| 
| Baron Davis (25)
| Blake Griffin (12)
| Baron Davis (8)
| Amway Center18,987
| 19–32
|- bgcolor="#ccffcc"
| 52
| February 9
| @ New York
| 
| Randy Foye (24)
| Eric Bledsoe,DeAndre Jordan (8)
| Baron Davis (16)
| Madison Square Garden19,763
| 20–32
|- bgcolor="#ffcccc"
| 53
| February 11
| @ Cleveland
| 
| Blake Griffin (32)
| Blake Griffin (13)
| Baron Davis (7)
| Quicken Loans Arena20,562
| 20–33
|- bgcolor="#ffcccc"
| 54
| February 13
| @ Toronto
| 
| Blake Griffin (21)
| Blake Griffin (15)
| Baron Davis (7)
| Air Canada Centre19,800
| 20–34
|- bgcolor="#ffcccc"
| 55
| February 14
| @ Milwaukee
| 
| Baron Davis (22)
| Blake Griffin (12)
| Baron Davis,Blake Griffin (6)
| Bradley Center13,111
| 20–35
|- bgcolor="#ccffcc"
| 56
| February 16
| @ Minnesota
| 
| Blake Griffin (29)
| Eric Bledsoe,Blake Griffin,DeAndre Jordan (8)
| Baron Davis,Randy Foye (6)
| Target Center15,227
| 21–35
|- align="center"
|colspan="9" bgcolor="#bbcaff"|All-Star Break
|- bgcolor="#ffcccc"
| 57
| February 22
| @ Oklahoma City
| 
| Blake Griffin (28)
| Blake Griffin (11)
| Blake Griffin (8)
| Oklahoma City Arena18,203
| 21–36
|- bgcolor="#ffcccc"
| 58
| February 23
| @ New Orleans
| 
| Blake Griffin (21)
| Blake Griffin (13)
| Randy Foye (9)
| New Orleans Arena17,537
| 21–37
|- bgcolor="#ffcccc"
| 59
| February 25
| @ L.A. Lakers
| 
| Randy Foye (24)
| Blake Griffin (10)
| Eric Bledsoe (8)
| Staples Center18,997
| 21–38
|- bgcolor="#ffcccc"
| 60
| February 26
| Boston
| 
| Randy Foye (32)
| Blake Griffin (11)
| Randy Foye (7)
| Staples Center19,513
| 21–39
|- bgcolor="#ffcccc"
| 61
| February 28
| @ Sacramento
| 
| Blake Griffin (27)
| Blake Griffin (12)
| Eric Bledsoe,Mo Williams (5)
| ARCO Arena17,317
| 21–40
|-

|- bgcolor="#ccffcc"
| 62
| March 2
| Houston
| 
| Eric Gordon (24)
| DeAndre Jordan (16)
| Mo Williams (11)
| Staples Center19,060
| 22–40
|- bgcolor="#ccffcc"
| 63
| March 5
| Denver
| 
| Eric Bledsoe (20)
| Blake Griffin (12)
| Blake Griffin (9)
| Staples Center19,060
| 23–40
|- bgcolor="#ccffcc"
| 64
| March 7
| @ Charlotte
| 
| Blake Griffin,Mo Williams (17)
| Blake Griffin (15)
| Mo Williams (7)
| Time Warner Cable Arena16,438
| 24–40
|- bgcolor="#ccffcc"
| 65
| March 9
| @ Boston
| 
| Mo Williams (28)
| DeAndre Jordan (9)
| Randy Foye (12)
| TD Garden18,624
| 25–40
|- bgcolor="#ffcccc"
| 66
| March 11
| @ New Jersey
| 
| Blake Griffin,Chris Kaman (23)
| Chris Kaman (10)
| Randy Foye (7)
| Prudential Center18,711
| 25–41
|- bgcolor="#ccffcc"
| 67
| March 12
| @ Washington
| 
| Blake Griffin (26)
| DeAndre Jordan (17)
| Eric Bledsoe,Mo Williams (6)
| Verizon Center20,278
| 26–41
|- bgcolor="#ffcccc"
| 68
| March 14
| @ Memphis
| 
| Eric Bledsoe (19)
| Blake Griffin (9)
| Eric Bledsoe (4)
| FedExForum15,989
| 26–42
|- bgcolor="#ffcccc"
| 69
| March 16
| Philadelphia
| 
| Randy Foye (20)
| DeAndre Jordan (15)
| Mo Williams (8)
| Staples Center19,060
| 26–43
|- bgcolor="#ccffcc"
| 70
| March 19
| Cleveland
| 
| Blake Griffin (30)
| Blake Griffin (8)
| Blake Griffin (8)
| Staples Center19,060
| 27–43
|- bgcolor="#ffcccc"
| 71
| March 20
| Phoenix
| 
| Chris Kaman (21)
| Chris Kaman (11)
| Mo Williams (7)
| Staples Center19,060
| 27–44
|- bgcolor="#ccffcc"
| 72
| March 23
| Washington
| 
| Blake Griffin (33)
| Blake Griffin (17)
| Blake Griffin,Mo Williams (10)
| Staples Center19,060
| 28–44
|- bgcolor="#ffcccc"
| 73
| March 25
| @ L.A. Lakers
| 
| Mo Williams (30)
| DeAndre Jordan (7)
| Mo Williams (6)
| Staples Center18,997
| 28–45
|- bgcolor="#ccffcc"
| 74
| March 26
| Toronto
| 
| Blake Griffin (22)
| Blake Griffin (16)
| Mo Williams (6)
| Staples Center19,060
| 29–45
|- bgcolor="#ffcccc"
| 75
| March 30
| Dallas
| 
| Blake Griffin (25)
| Blake Griffin (17)
| Eric Gordon,Mo Williams (5)
| Staples Center19,060
| 29–46
|-

|- bgcolor="#ffcccc"
| 76
| April 1
| @ Phoenix
| 
| Eric Gordon (21)
| Blake Griffin (13)
| Blake Griffin (4)
| US Airways Center18,422
| 29–47
|- bgcolor="#ccffcc"
| 77
| April 2
| Oklahoma City
| 
| Blake Griffin (26)
| Blake Griffin (16)
| Eric Gordon,Mo Williams (5)
| Staples Center19,060
| 30–47
|- bgcolor="#ccffcc"
| 78
| April 5
| @ Memphis
| 
| Mo Williams (16)
| Blake Griffin (14)
| Randy Foye (4)
| FedExForum15,433
| 31–47
|- bgcolor="#ffcccc"
| 79
| April 6
| @ Oklahoma City
| 
| Blake Griffin (35)
| Blake Griffin (11)
| Mo Williams (9)
| Oklahoma City Arena18,203
| 31–48
|- bgcolor="#ffcccc"
| 80
| April 8
| @ Dallas
| 
| Mo Williams (29)
| DeAndre Jordan (10)
| Eric Gordon,Blake Griffin,Mo Williams (6)
| American Airlines Center20,382
| 31–49
|- bgcolor="#ffcccc"
| 81
| April 9
| @ Houston
| 
| Eric Gordon (19)
| DeAndre Jordan (11)
| Eric Gordon (6)
| Toyota Center18,089
| 31–50
|- bgcolor="#ccffcc"
| 82
| April 13
| Memphis
| 
| Blake Griffin (31)
| Blake Griffin,DeAndre Jordan (10)
| Blake Griffin (10)
| Staples Center19,060
| 32–50
|-

Player statistics

Season

|- align="center" bgcolor=""
| 
| 81 || 14 || 17.9 || .394 || .315 || .773 || 3.3 || .7 || .7 || .3 || 5.6
|- align="center" bgcolor="#f0f0f0"
| 
| 81 || 25 || 22.7 || .424 || .276 || .744 || 2.8 || 3.6 || 1.1 || .3 || 6.7
|- align="center" bgcolor=""
| *
| 41 || 2 || 18.1 || .323 || .326 || .667 || 1.9 || .7 || .2 || .4 || 5.0
|- align="center" bgcolor="#f0f0f0"
| *
| 23 || 0 || 6.8 || .333 || .000 || .700 || .7 || .0 || .2 || .0 || .7
|- align="center" bgcolor=""
| 
| 40 || 0 || 11.2 || .424 || style="background:#106bb4;color:white;" | .430 || .625 || 2.4 || .4 || .3 || .3 || 4.8
|- align="center" bgcolor="#f0f0f0"
| *
| 43 || 35 || 29.5 || .416 || .296 || .760 || 2.8 || style="background:#106bb4;color:white;" | 7.0 || style="background:#106bb4;color:white;" | 1.4 || .5 || 12.8
|- align="center" bgcolor=""
| 
| 36 || 0 || 13.1 || .561 || .000 || .661 || 3.2 || .1 || .1 || .1 || 5.8
|- align="center" bgcolor="#f0f0f0"
| 
| 63 || 24 || 24.6 || .388 || .327|| style="background:#106bb4;color:white;" | .893 || 1.6 || 2.7 || .8 || .3 || 9.8
|- align="center" bgcolor=""
| 
| 76 || 62 || 27.6 || .410 || .341 || .718 || 3.3 || 1.6 || .8 || .2 || 7.2
|- align="center" bgcolor="#f0f0f0"
| 
| 56 || 56 || 37.4 || .450 || .364|| .825 || 2.9 || 4.4 || 1.3 || .3 || 22.3
|- align="center" bgcolor=""
| 
| style="background:#106bb4;color:white;" |  82 || style="background:#106bb4;color:white;" | 82 || style="background:#106bb4;color:white;" | 38.0 || .506 || .292 || .642 || style="background:#106bb4;color:white;" | 12.1 || 3.8 || .8 || .5 || style="background:#106bb4;color:white;" | 22.5
|- align="center" bgcolor="#f0f0f0"
| 
| 80 || 66 || 25.6 || style="background:#106bb4;color:white;" | .686 || .000 || .452 || 7.2 || .5 || .5 || style="background:#106bb4;color:white;" | 1.8 || 7.1
|- align="center" bgcolor=""
| 
| 32 || 15 || 26.2 || .471 || .000 || .754 || 7.0 || 1.4 || .5 || 1.5 || 12.4
|- align="center" bgcolor="#f0f0f0"
| *
| 19 || 7 || 14.6 || .424 || .393 || .833 || 2.5 || .4 || .2 || .3 || 3.5
|- align="center" bgcolor=""
| 
| 48 || 0 || 12.2 || .553 || .000 || .735 || 2.4 || .6 || .3 || .2 || 5.4
|- align="center" bgcolor="#f0f0f0"
| 
| 19 || 0 || 17.1 || .371 || .333 || .750 || .6 || 1.4 || .3 || .0 || 1.9
|- align="center" bgcolor=""
| *
| 22 || 22 || 32.9 || .422 || .398 || .880 || 2.5 || 5.6 || .9 || .0 || 15.2
|}

* – Stats with the Clippers.

Awards, records and milestones

Awards

Week/Month

All-Star
 Blake Griffin becomes the first rookie since Tim Duncan in 1998 to be voted by league coaches as a reserve for the Western Conference All-Stars.  He also becomes the first rookie since Yao Ming in 2003 to play in an All-Star Game.
 Blake Griffin also becomes the first and only NBA player to participate in three separate NBA All-Star Weekend events: As part of the Rookie Team in The T-Mobile NBA Rookie Challenge on Friday, the Slam Dunk Contest on Saturday and the NBA All-Star Game on Sunday.  He won in all three events.
 Blake Griffin becomes the third Clipper to participate and the second Clipper to win the Slam Dunk Contest.
 Eric Bledsoe is also chosen to play for the Rookie Team in The T-Mobile NBA Rookie Challenge.

Season

Records

Milestones

Injuries and surgeries

Transactions

Trades

Free agents

Re-signed

Additions

Subtractions

References

Los Angeles Clippers seasons
Los Angeles Clippers